Terrence DaQuay Holt (born March 5, 1980) is a former American football safety. He was drafted by the Detroit Lions in the 5th round (137th overall) of the 2003 NFL Draft. He played college football at North Carolina State University.

Holt was also a member of the Arizona Cardinals, Carolina Panthers, Chicago Bears, and New Orleans Saints. He is the younger brother of All-Pro wide receiver Torry Holt.

Professional career

Detroit Lions
Holt played for the Detroit Lions from 2003 to 2006.

Arizona Cardinals
On March 8, 2007, the Arizona Cardinals signed Holt to a $15 million, 5-year contract. On February 21, 2008, Holt was released by the Cardinals.

Carolina Panthers
On March 20, 2008, Holt was signed by the Carolina Panthers, but was released on August 30.

Chicago Bears
Holt was signed by the Chicago Bears on October 22, 2008, after cornerback Zackary Bowman was placed on injured reserve. He was waived on November 11 when the team promoted practice squad defensive end Ervin Baldwin to the active roster.

New Orleans Saints
The New Orleans Saints signed Holt on December 3, 2008. He participated in the final two games of the Saints' regular season. He was not re-signed by the team and became a free agent.

After football
In 2014, Holt launched a construction company with his brother, based in North Carolina.

References

External links
Carolina Panthers bio
Chicago Bears bio
Detroit Lions bio
New Orleans Saints bio

1980 births
Living people
American football safeties
NC State Wolfpack football players
Detroit Lions players
Arizona Cardinals players
Carolina Panthers players
Chicago Bears players
New Orleans Saints players
People from Gibsonville, North Carolina
Players of American football from Greensboro, North Carolina